Trilogija 2: Devičanska ostrva (Serbian Cyrillic: Трилогија 2: Девичанска острва, trans. Trilogy 2: Virgin Islands) is the second EP from Serbian and former Yugoslav rock band Riblja Čorba. It is the second part of the Riblja Čorba trilogy released during 2005 and 2006. The band considers EPs Trilogija 1: Nevinost bez zaštite, Trilogija 2: Devičanska ostrva and Trilogija 3: Ambasadori loše volje three parts of the studio album titled Trilogija, although all three were released separately. All the songs from three EPs were released on the compilation album Trilogija.

Album cover
The album cover was designed by Jugoslav and Jakša Vlahović.

Track listing

Personnel
Bora Đorđević - vocals
Vidoja Božinović - guitar
Miša Aleksić - bass guitar, co-producer
Vicko Milatović - drums
Nikola Zorić - keyboards, recorded by

Additional personnel
Željko Savić - backing vocals
Milan Popović - producer
Uroš Marković - recorded by
Oliver Jovanović - engineer, mixed by, mastered by

References
Trilogija 2: Devičanska ostrva at Discogs
 EX YU ROCK enciklopedija 1960-2006,  Janjatović Petar;

External links
Trilogija 2: Devičanska ostrva at Discogs

Riblja Čorba EPs
2006 EPs

sr:Трилогија (албум)